Belgium was represented by Fud Leclerc, with the song '"Ton nom", at the 1962 Eurovision Song Contest, which took place on 18 March in Luxembourg City. The song was chosen in the Belgian national final on 19 February. This was Leclerc's fourth time at Eurovision, and he still shares the record (with Elisabeth Andreassen, Peter, Sue & Marc and Valentina Monetta) for the most Eurovision appearances as a main performer. "Ton nom" has also gone down in history as the first Eurovision performance ever to score the infamous nul-points.

Before Eurovision

Finale Belge du Grand Prix Eurovision 1962 

Finale Belge du Grand Prix Eurovision 1962 was the national final format developed by RTB in order to select Belgium's entry for the Eurovision Song Contest 1962. The competition was held on 1 February 1962 at the Cultural and Artistic Center in Uccle and aired on 19 February at 20:30 CET.

Final 

The final was held on 1 February 1962 and later aired on 19 February 1962. "Ton nom," performed by Fud Leclerc, was selected as the winning song by a 10-member jury, headed by Robert Ledent.

At Eurovision 
On the night of the final Leclerc performed second in the running order, following Finland and preceding Spain. Voting was by each national jury awarding 3, 2 and 1 point(s) to their top three songs, and at the close of the voting "Ton nom" had failed to register any points, placing Belgium joint last with three other zero points entries from Austria, the Netherlands and Spain. This was the second consecutive year in which Belgium finished the evening at the foot of the scoreboard. The Belgian jury awarded its 3 points to Luxembourg.

1962 was the first contest in which any entry had failed to score, and although four countries shared the ignominy, Leclerc is usually awarded the dubious accolade of being the first ever Eurovision nul-pointer, due to "Ton nom" having been performed earliest of the four in the running order.

Voting 
Belgium did not receive any points at the 1962 Eurovision Song Contest.

References 

1962
Countries in the Eurovision Song Contest 1962
Eurovision